Hoosier Holiday is a 1943 American comedy film directed by Frank McDonald and written by Dorrell McGowan and Stuart E. McGowan. The film stars George D. Hay, Isabel Randolph, Shug Fisher, Lillian Randolph, Dale Evans and George Byron. The film was released on September 13, 1943, by Republic Pictures.

Plot

Cast  
George D. Hay as The Solemn Old Judge
Isabel Randolph as Abigail Fairchild
Shug Fisher as Shug' Fishet
Lillian Randolph as Birdie
Dale Evans as Dale Fairchild
George Byron as Jim Baker
Emma Dunn as Molly Baker
Thurston Hall as Henry P. Fairchild
Nick Stewart as Aloysius Lincoln
Ferris Taylor as Governor Manning
Georgia Davis as Grace Manning
Sleepy Williams as Sleepy Williams
Three Shades of Rhythm as Singers
Ken Trietsch as Hotshot Ken 
Paul Trietsch as Hotshot Hezzie 
Charles Ward as Hotshot Gabe 
Frank Kettering as Hotshot Frank 
Gwen Verdon as Cheerleader
The Hoosier Hotshots as Hoosier Hot Shots
The Music Maids as Singers

References

External links
 

1943 films
American comedy films
1943 comedy films
Republic Pictures films
Films directed by Frank McDonald
American black-and-white films
1940s English-language films
1940s American films